Amiflamine (FLA-336) is a reversible inhibitor of monoamine oxidase A (MAO-A), thereby being a RIMA, and, to a lesser extent, semicarbazide-sensitive amine oxidase (SSAO), as well as a serotonin releasing agent (SRA). It is a derivative of the phenethylamine and amphetamine chemical classes. The (+)-enantiomer is the active stereoisomer.

Amiflamine shows preference for inhibiting MAO-A in serotonergic relative to noradrenergic and dopaminergic neurons. In other words, at low doses, it can be used to selectively inhibit MAO-A enzymes in serotonin cells, whereas at higher doses it loses its selectivity. This property is attributed to amiflamine's higher affinity for the serotonin transporter over the norepinephrine and dopamine transporters, as transporter-mediated carriage is required for amiflamine to enter monoaminergic neurons.

See also 
 Reversible inhibitor of MAO-A (RIMA)
 Monoamine oxidase inhibitor (MAOI)

References 

Substituted amphetamines
Monoamine oxidase inhibitors
Serotonin releasing agents
Anilines